The Bayer designation Upsilon Centauri (υ Cen / υ Centauri) is shared by two star systems, in the constellation Centaurus:
 Upsilon¹ Centauri
 Upsilon² Centauri
They are separated by 0.96° on the sky.

All of them were member of asterism 柱 (Zhǔ), Pillars, Horn mansion.

References

Centauri, Upsilon
Centaurus (constellation)